Solanum galapagense is a wild tomato in the family Solanaceae section Lycopersicum and is one of two tomato species endemic to the Galápagos Islands, 500 miles west of Ecuador. It was at these islands where Charles Darwin noted the structural difference between local finches, iguanas, and barnacles, leading him to identify natural selection as a possible source of the origin of species. He also collected plant specimens extensively.

The species occurs mostly on coastal lava within range of sea spray, to within one meter of the high tide mark. It is strongly salt tolerant. Its range can also extend inland, such as on the volcanic slopes of the islands of Isabela and Fernandina.

Solanum galapagense and the similar Solanum cheesmaniae are recognized as distinct species, although S. cheesmanii is the one most commonly called the Galapagos tomato. The fruit of S. galapagense are smaller and hairier, with a distinct orange color. The foliage of S. galapagense is also more bushy and smelly.

References

galapagense
Endemic flora of Ecuador
Endemic flora of Galápagos